David Audley Moberley Rome (14 April 1910 – 20 May 1970) was an English cricketer active in the early 1930s, making four appearances in first-class cricket. Born at Marylebone, London, Rome was a right-handed batsman and right-arm medium pace bowler, who played for Middlesex.

Career and life
The son of Brigadier General Claude Stuart Rome, Rome was educated at Harrow School where he captained the school cricket team in 1929. He later attended the University of Cambridge, where he did not play first-class cricket for the university. He would make his debut in first-class cricket for Middlesex against Cambridge University at Fenner's in 1930. His next two first-class appearances for Middlesex in 1931 and 1933 were both against Cambridge University, while his fourth first-class appearance came in the 1933 County Championship against Glamorgan. He scored a total of 56 runs in his four appearances, averaging 9.33, with a high score of 32.

He was for many years a member of the Surrey County Cricket Club Committee. He died following a fall at The Oval on 20 May 1970.

References

External links
David Rome at ESPNcricinfo
David Rome at CricketArchive

1910 births
1970 deaths
People from Marylebone
People educated at Harrow School
Alumni of the University of Cambridge
English cricketers
Middlesex cricketers
English cricket administrators
20th-century British businesspeople